Byrom is a toponymic surname, a variant spelling of Byron, derived from Byram, North Yorkshire. Notable people with the surname include:

 Eddie Byrom (born 1997), Zimbabwean cricketer
 Edward Byrom (1724–1773), English accountant
 George Byrom Whittaker (1793–1847), English bookseller and publisher
 Gordon Byrom Rogers (1901–1967), United States Army lieutenant general
 Joel Byrom (born 1986), English footballer
 John Byrom (disambiguation)
 Larry Byrom (born 1948), American guitarist
 Monty Byrom (born 1958), American rock, blues and country singer-songwriter
 Ray Byrom (1935–2020), English footballer

See also 
 
 
 Biram (disambiguation), a variant spelling
 Biron (surname), a variant spelling
 Byram (surname), a variant spelling
 Byrum (surname), a variant spelling

References 

English toponymic surnames